Zhang Changhong may refer to:
 Zhang Changhong (businessman)
 Zhang Changhong (sport shooter)